William Drummond (born ca.1617, died 1677) was the first colonial governor of Albemarle Sound settlement in the Province of Carolina and a participant in Bacon's Rebellion.

Early life and career
Drummond was born in Scotland and came to Virginia in 1637 as an indentured servant to Theodore Moye. He was an indentured servant to Stephen Webb in 1639.

He rose to the positions of Justice of the Peace and High Sheriff of James City County. He discovered a large, circular lake in the center of the Great Dismal Swamp in 1655, now named Lake Drummond.

In 1664, Drummond was chosen to be governor of the Albemarle County colony (which would eventually become North Carolina) by Virginia Governor William Berkeley at the request of Berkeley's fellow Lords Proprietor of the colony. Drummond summoned the first legislative assembly in Carolina in 1665. Samuel Stephens succeeded him as governor.

He had at least five children with his wife Sarah Drummond.

Death
Drummond returned to Virginia in 1667 and later supported Nathaniel Bacon during Bacon's Rebellion against the government of Governor Berkeley. After Bacon was defeated, Drummond was found guilty of treason and rebellion against the king. Governor Berkeley had Drummond executed on January 20, 1677.

Legacy
Drummond discovered a large, circular lake in the center of the Great Dismal Swamp in 1655. The lake was named after him, and is called Lake Drummond.

References

External links
Biography from Carolana.com
Biography from Encyclopedia Virginia
Lake Drummond
North Carolina Historical Marker

American colonial people
Colonial governors and administrators
Kingdom of Scotland emigrants to the Thirteen Colonies
1677 deaths
Executed Scottish people
People executed by the Colony of Virginia
Year of birth unknown
Place of birth unknown
Date of death unknown
Place of death unknown
17th-century executions of American people
17th-century executions by England